Julio Leonel Mosevich (born 4 February 1997) is an Argentine professional footballer who plays as a centre-back for Patronato, on loan from Argentinos Juniors.

Club career
Mosevich's career started with Argentinos Juniors. He was an unused substitute in an Primera División match against Olimpo in November 2015, prior to making his professional league debut on 13 March 2016 versus Temperley. By August 2017, Mosevich had made five appearances for Argentinos. On 30 June 2018, Swiss Super League side FC St. Gallen completed the loan signing of Mosevich. His first appearance arrived on 26 July, during a UEFA Europa League qualifying match with Sarpsborg 08. Sixteen further appearances followed in all competitions as they placed sixth in the Super League.

On 29 June 2019, a loan to Nacional of Portugal's LigaPro was agreed. He didn't appear competitively until 10 November, featuring in a victory over Covilhã. He went on to appear fourteen times, scoring his first senior goal in the process during a win against Farense on 7 December. The club was promoted to the Primeira Liga after finishing in first place, though weren't officially deemed champions as the season was cut short due to the COVID-19 pandemic. Mosevich soon returned to Argentina, before leaving on loan to Portuguese football again on 6 October 2020 as he agreed to terms with newly promoted LigaPro team Vizela.

In January 2022, Mosevich moved to Patronato on a one-year loan deal

International career
2017 saw Mosevich called up by Argentina U20 manager Claudio Úbeda for the 2017 FIFA U-20 World Cup in South Korea. He made his U20 debut in Argentina's final Group A match versus Guinea. A year previous he was called up for the 2016 COTIF Tournament but didn't feature. In July 2019, Mosevich was selected by the U23s for the 2019 Pan American Games in Peru. He featured four times as they won it.

Career statistics
.

Honours
Argentinos Juniors
Primera B Nacional: 2016–17

Argentina U23
Pan American Games: 2019

References

External links

1997 births
Living people
Argentine footballers
Argentine expatriate footballers
People from Lomas de Zamora
Argentina under-20 international footballers
Argentina youth international footballers
Footballers at the 2019 Pan American Games
Pan American Games gold medalists for Argentina
Pan American Games medalists in football
Club Atlético Patronato footballers
Medalists at the 2019 Pan American Games
Olympic footballers of Argentina
Footballers at the 2020 Summer Olympics
Association football defenders
Argentine Primera División players
Primera Nacional players
Swiss Super League players
Liga Portugal 2 players
FC St. Gallen players
C.D. Nacional players
F.C. Vizela players
Argentinos Juniors footballers
Expatriate footballers in Switzerland
Expatriate footballers in Portugal
Argentine expatriate sportspeople in Switzerland
Argentine expatriate sportspeople in Portugal
Sportspeople from Buenos Aires Province
Argentine people of Belarusian descent